Osov is a municipality and village in Beroun District in the Central Bohemian Region of the Czech Republic. It has about 300 inhabitants.

Administrative parts
The village of Osovec is an administrative part of Osov.

History
The first written mention of Osov is from 1225.

References

Villages in the Beroun District